Leo Lööf (born 25 April 2002) is a Swedish professional ice hockey defenceman for Ilves of the Finnish Liiga. He previously played for Färjestad BK of the Swedish Hockey League (SHL).

Playing career
Lööf made his professional debut during the 2019–20 season where he appeared in one game for Färjestad BK of the SHL. He was drafted in the third round, 89th overall, by the St. Louis Blues in the 2020 NHL Entry Draft.

International play

Lööf represented Sweden at the 2022 World Junior Ice Hockey Championships and won a bronze medal.

Career statistics

Regular season and playoffs

International

References

External links
 

2002 births
Living people
Färjestad BK players
Ilves players
Sportspeople from Karlstad
St. Louis Blues draft picks
Swedish ice hockey players